Protein transport protein Sec61 subunit gamma is a protein that in humans is encoded by the SEC61G gene.

Function 

The Sec61 complex is the central component of the protein translocation apparatus of the endoplasmic reticulum (ER) membrane. The Sec61 complex forms a transmembrane channel where proteins are translocated across and integrated into the ER membrane. This complex consists of three membrane proteins- alpha, beta, and gamma. This gene encodes the gamma-subunit protein. Alternatively spliced transcript variants encoding the same protein have been identified.

References

Further reading